This is a list of the symbols of the provinces and territories of Canada. Each province and territory has a unique set of official symbols.

Provinces and territories

See also

 Arms of Canada
 List of Canadian flags
 Flags of provinces and territories of Canada
 National symbols of Canada
 Canadian Red Ensign
 Regional tartans of Canada

References

!
Symbols
Canadian provincial and territorial symbols